Hypobapta percomptaria, the southern grey, is a moth of the family Geometridae first described by Achille Guenée in 1857. It is known from Australia, including South Australia, New South Wales, Queensland, Victoria and Tasmania.

The wingspan is about 50 mm. Adults are grey-brown with wavy lines. Specimens from Tasmania are generally paler than mainland specimens.

The larvae feed on Eucalyptus species. Young larvae are brown with a red head and tail. Later instars become green with a conical head.

References

External links

Pseudoterpnini
Moths of Australia
Taxa named by Achille Guenée
Moths described in 1857